Consort Donggo (1639 – 23 September 1660), of the Manchu Plain White Banner Donggo clan, was a consort of the Shunzhi Emperor. She was one year his junior.

Life

Family background
Consort Donggo's personal name was not recorded in history. Her ancestral home was in Liaoning.

 Father: Eshuo (d. 1657), served as a first rank military official
 Paternal grandfather: Xihan
 Mother: Lady Aisin-Gioro
 Maternal grandfather: Murhu (穆尔祜)
 Maternal grandmother: Lady Borjigit
 One younger brother

Shunzhi era
In the summer of 1656, Lady Donggo entered the Forbidden City and was deeply loved and favoured by the Shunzhi Emperor. On 12 October 1656, she was granted the title "Consort Xian". On 19 January 1657, she was elevated to "Imperial Noble Consort". The Shunzhi Emperor held a grand ceremony for the promotion of Lady Donggo and proclaimed an amnesty. When Lady Donggo became the Imperial Noble Consort, she shared the power of managing the inner court with Empress Xiaohuizhang, which gives the empress a pressure of being deposed, on which Emperor Shunzhi wants to do but, to no avail because the ministers and officials opposed to deposed the second empress.

On 12 November 1657, Lady Donggo gave birth to the emperor's fourth son. The premature death of their son on 25 February 1658 had a great impact on Lady Donggo and the Shunzhi Emperor. Lady Donggo fell ill and died on 23 September 1660. The Shunzhi Emperor was so overwhelmed with grief that he stopped attending daily court meetings for five days to mourn Lady Donggo. It was also said that the Shunzhi Emperor was so depressed that he wanted to commit suicide, and his subjects had to watch over him every day for fear of his safety. Two days after her death, Lady Donggo was posthumously granted the title of Empress, an uncommon gesture. She was interred in the Xiao Mausoleum of the Eastern Qing tombs.

Titles
 During the reign of Hong Taiji (r. 1626–1643):
 Lady Donggo (from 1639)
 During the reign of the Shunzhi Emperor (r. 1643–1661):
 Consort Xian (from 12 October 1656), fourth rank consort
 Imperial Noble Consort (from 19 January 1657), second rank consort
 Empress Xiaoxian (from 25 September 1660)

Issue
 As Imperial Noble Consort:
 The Shunzhi Emperor's fourth son (12 November 1657 – 25 February 1658)

In fiction and popular culture
 Portrayed by Ko Miusze in The Duke of Mount Deer (1984)
 Portrayed by Ng Ning in The Rise and Fall of Qing Dynasty (1987)
 Portrayed by Bo Hong in Kangxi Dynasty (2001)
 Portrayed by Shu Chang in Xiaozhuang Mishi (2003)
 Portrayed by Océane Zhu in The Life and Times of a Sentinel (2011)
Portrayed by Zhang Xueying in In Love with Power (2012).

See also
 Ranks of imperial consorts in China#Qing
 Royal and noble ranks of the Qing dynasty

Notes

References
 

1639 births
1660 deaths
Qing dynasty posthumous empresses
Manchu people
17th-century Chinese women
17th-century Chinese people